Goneri of Brittany was a sixth-century hermit of the church in Britain.

Goneri lived as an exile to the world amongst the Breton people, a Celtic nation of northwestern France.  It is recorded that his hermitage was situated near the community of Tréguier.

Saint Goneri of Brittany is commemorated 18 July in the Orthodox and Catholic Churches.

See also

Julian Maunoir, "Apostle of Brittany"

References
Catholic Online
Latin Saints of the Orthodox Patriarchate of Rome

French hermits
Southwestern Brythonic saints
Medieval Breton saints
6th-century Christian saints